Kluen Cheewit (lit. "Life's Waves" or "Waves of Life", also spelled Kluen Cheevit) is a 2017 Thai drama that stars Prin Suparat, Urassaya Sperbund, Louis Scott (actor), and Jarinporn Joonkiat. It aired on Channel 3 from January 23, 2017 to March 13, 2017 (Monday and Tuesday). The drama is based on a novel with the same title and also a remake version of Khluen Chiwit (1995). This is the second collaboration between Prin Suparat and Urassaya Sperbund, after 6 years, who previously worked together in the lakorn entitled Tawan Deard.

Synopsis

Jeerawat (Urassaya Sperbund) is a famous model and actress. On the surface, Jeerawat has a perfect life but deep down, she is in danger of being raped by her stepfather and longs for her mother's love. After Jeewarat's rich and powerful stepfather drugs Jeerawat, she manages to escape by driving away. Unfortunately, she hits a young woman on the road, who later dies at the hospital.

The dead young woman has a fiancée, Sathit (Prin Suparat), who is a lawyer who believes strongly in justice. He vows revenge on the female driver who killed his beloved fiancée. Unfortunately, Jeerawat's stepfather and mother use their influence and money to hide and hush all evidence. After coincidentally running into each other on many occasions, their fated encounters starts to change them both, as their bond deepens, Sathit becomes conflicted between the evidence that Jeerawat was involved in the car accident and between the good and kind person he finds underneath her public appearance, who risks her life for him. What will Sathit do when he gradually falls in love with Jeewarat?

Casts

Main Casts
Prin Suparat as Sathit Wadcharaporn / Thit (Lawyer)
Urassaya Sperbund as Jeerawat Suriyarat / Jee (Miss G) (Thai female TV actress)
Louis Scott as Chaiyan Disathaporn (Piak's Husband)
Jarinporn Joonkiat as Piyakul Disathaporn or Piak (Chaiyan's Wife)
Masu Junyangdikul as Jade Wadcharapan  (Janejira's elder brother/Completion Engineer PETROL THAI OIL GROUP)
Nuttanicha Dungwattanawanich as Daraka Pirunworakul / Dao (Jeerawat's Friend)
Nalinthip Sakulongumpai as Janejira Wadcharapan (Jade's younger sister/Dao junior/Lawyer)
Chotika Wongwilas as Pim (Thai female TV actress)

Supporting Casts
Sriphan Chunechomboon as Looknam (Pim Personal Manager)
Eckhai Ueasangkhomserot as Suki (Jeerawat Personal Manager)  
Santisuk Promsiri (Noom) as Patna (Piyakul (Piak) Father) 
Kik Mayurin Pongpudpunth as Kun-Ying Jariya Maitreesawad (Jeerawat Mother)  
Teerapong Leowrakwong as Sitta Maitreesawad (Philanthropist Businessman) 
Anant Boonnark as Kroo Ar-Ree (Former primary school teacher in Jeerawat childhood) 
Khwanruedi Klomklom as Nawadee Banbordee (Kroo Tiwwadee Mother) 
Prima Ratchata as Siriluk (Servant of the Sittha House)

Guest role
Mai Warit Sirisantana as Mai / Rut (Thai male television actor) (Ep.1,4) 
Prim Prima Bhunjaroeun as Tiwwadee Banbordee or Kroo Tiew (Sathit Ex-girlfriend) (Ep.1,2,3,4,6,8) 
Surint Karawoot (Woot) as Phan Tamruat Tri Pised (Sathit Friend) (Ep.1,2,3,9,10,11,12,13,14) 
Tassawan Seneewongse Na Ayutthaya as Penjan Santid (Yai Jan) (Thepan's grandmother) (Ep.4,5,6,7,9)
Freudonidas (Freud) Natthapong Chartpong as Thepan (Pan) (Grandson of Grandma Penchan) (Ep.4,5,6,7,9,10)  
 Gale Warunlak Sirimaneewattana as Rada (Piyakul (Piak) Friend/Thai female TV actress) (Ep.3)
 Piya Sawetpikul as Pee Ka (Owner of a charity walk) (Ep.1)
 Tum Rossarin Jantra as Joung-Jan Wadcharapan (Jade and Janejira Mother/private school owner) (Ep.2,5)
Jack Chakapan as Wetid (Way) (Sathit Friend) (Ep.7,8,9)  
 Napat Chumjitri (King Konbai) as Stephan (Private chauffeur Jeerawat) (Ep.1,2) 
 as Nukoon (Sathit Friend/Lawyer) (Ep.1)
 Kittiphon Ketmanee (Ep.2)
Jirada moran as Jeerawat (chird) (Ep.4)

Performer
 Siwakorn Wiroaddun as Guests at the fashion show (Ep.1)
 Kittipong Sanjorn as Employees of P Production Company (Ep.1) 
 Wirawut Kemkhang as Sitta Henchman (Ep.1) 
 Suttipong Payaksan as Sitta Henchman (Ep.1) 
 Vita Deeplangploy as a guest at a charity event (Ep.1) 
 Leosak Teerarangkoon as Tiewwadee Banbordee (Kroo Tiew) guests in black and white (Ep.1) 
 Jutharat Jinrat as Tiewwadee Banbordee (Kroo Tiew) guests in black and white (Ep.1) 
 Malee Thaworn as Tiewwadee Banbordee (Kroo Tiew) guests in black and white (Ep.1) 
 Chalesoun Hanchana as Priest (Ep.1) 
 as Sutee (private driver Jeerawat) (Ep.1,2,7)
 as Jack (Children in Ban Nawadee) (Ep.2,3,4,6,14)
 as Mong (Children in Ban Nawadee) (Ep.2,3,4,6,14) 
 Pairoad Naiplay as Villagers (Ep.2)
 Jidtrakorn Pinprathanporn as Kun Nai (Ep.2) 
 as Nang Am (Patana house servant) (Ep.2) 
 Pongsit Phisitthakan as Sorawit (Wit) (Sathit Company Employees) (Ep.2,4,10,14) 
 as Thantawam (Tawan) (Sathit Company Employees) (Ep.2,3,4,10,11,12,)  
 Kridtapad Jantanapoti as Padtana Cotton Lawyer (Ep.2)  
 Thanat Chadchawan as Judge (Ep.2)   
 Chadcharid Wanidphoonphon as Sitta Company Director (Ep.3)   
 Suntree Chodtipan as Sitta Company Director (Ep.3)    
 Supaporn Soipanich as Judge (Ep.3)   
 Nat Khaoyuan-Phueng as Guests in b branny (Ep.3)    
 Kanyapha Wayupad as Guests in b branny (Ep.3)     
 Ra-cha-ta Singchan as Guests in b branny (Ep.3)     
 Channatan Tiankittipong as Villagers in the market (Ep.4)     
 Ngan-Piece Sakuntala as Villagers (Ep.4)      
 Panyakorn Sornmayura as Kun Nai Cotton Lawyer (Ep.4)       
 Janejara Suwannai as Kun Nai (Ep.4)        
 Opad Sudtipien as Kun Nai ex-husband (Ep.4)        
 Honey Saeng Saeng as Foolish wife was hired by Mrs. (Ep.4)        
 Jirasak Neinramnong as Sia Meng Henchman (Ep.5)        
 Tanakrid Kanha as Sia Meng Henchman (Ep.5)         
 Poramed Samad as Sia Meng Henchman (Ep.5)          
 Krid Pudtarangsee as Private bank security guards (Ep.5)           
 as Sia Meng (community landowners) (Ep.5)            
 Yodchai Padchanee as Kokiet (Ar Piyakul (Piak)/TV station owner) (Ep.5)              
 Punyalak Supatammarat as Public Relations Officer, Star Gossip Publishing Company Limited (Ep.5)               
 as Editor of the Star Gossip Publishing House (Ep.5)               
 Daranphom Suriyawong as Sitta Henchman (Ep.7,13) 
 Jutamanee Chaimongkhon as Thai female TV actress (Ep.7,8)
 Aphidet Duanyai (Bank Tongtung) as Sitta Henchman (Ep.9) 
 Ammata Banteingtheb as truck driver (Ep.9) 
 Pansakuna Longjareinglab as Village aunt at Kamphaeng Phet (Ep.9) 
 Peeradet Ruengsamran as The detective was hired by Piyakul (Piak) (Ep.9) 
 Badin Moo-Muen-Sri as Priest (Ep.10)
 Supachok TaweeChok as Sitta Henchman (Ep.10,11)
 Jatuded Kasemlawan as Royal Thai Police (Ep.10)
 Nirut Sudjarid as Guests at a party with a model (Ep.10) 
 Tammanoon Jara as Guests at a party with a model (Ep.10)
 Waipod Krouysawad as Royal Thai Police (Ep.10) 
 Chalee Cheuo-Yai as Priest (Ep.12)
 Ektawan Kumchad as Physician (Ep.12)
 as Aongart Meethong (Procurement Engineer, Sittha Construction Co.,Ltd.) (Ep.13)
 Benjamalak ThibKhanthong as short news anchor (Ep.13) 
 Choochad Radomphon as Royal Thai Police (Ep.13)
 Kanungnuch Chudonwai as Journalist (Ep.15) 
 Chatwat Rattanawong as Thai male television actor (Ep.15) 
 as Aem (Suwit Husband) (Ep.15)

Ratings

In the table below,  represent the lowest ratings and  represent the highest ratings.

Reception

The drama was a major hit and received popularity in Thailand. It is considered to be the highest rated Lakorn of Channel 3 in 2017. Khluen Chiwit is one of the Thai dramas that became phenomenal in recent years in China. It tops the list of most-watched on Bilibili, and other popular video streaming websites in China. At that time of airing, the drama episodes were also top trending in social media sites like in Google and Twitter. Additionally, the drama received praise from the fans in China, Russia, Vietnam, Indonesia, Malaysia, and Arab Countries.

Furthermore, the drama received positive reviews from critics. Critics Thairath praised the director's ability to pull out the potential of the characters. Thairath also states that "Both Prin Suparat and Urassaya Sperbund portrayed their love and sweetness very well. Another, Nuttanicha Dungwattanawanich, Masu Junyangdikul, and Louis Scott are the characters that make the drama even more mesmerizing."

According to Post Today, they applauded the brilliant chemistry and romance between Prin Suparat and Urassaya Sperbund.

After the airing of the drama, Thai Netizens wanted Prin Suparat and Urassaya Sperbund to see and work together again in a new Lakorn.

Awards and nominations

References

Thai television soap operas
2017 Thai television series debuts
2017 Thai television series endings
Thai romance television series
Channel 3 (Thailand) original programming